Love Your Abuser Remixed is a 2008 album featuring remixes of tracks that were originally on the Lymbyc Systym album, Love Your Abuser.

Track listing

References

2008 remix albums
Remix albums by American artists
Lymbyc Systym albums
Mush Records albums